Sesamum schinzianum is a species of flowering plant in the Pedaliaceae family.

It is native to Angola and Namibia. It was originally described by Schinz based on information from Ascherson.

References

Pedaliaceae
Taxa named by Paul Friedrich August Ascherson
Flora of Angola
Flora of Namibia